The FIM Snowcross World Championship is a snocross (snowmobile racing) championship contested annually, inaugurated in 2004. The championship was preceded by the FIM Snowcross World Cup in 2003. The championship was contested over 3 to 4 races between 2004 and 2009 but has since switched to a one race championship

Due to COVID-19 related problems, the championship was not contested in 2020 and 2022. The 2023 edition was initially to be hosted in Kayseri, Turkey, but was postponed to 2024 due to the 2023 Turkey-Syria earthquake

Medals

FIM Snowcross Women's World Cup

References

External links 
FIM Snowcross
Snowcross at FIM website

Snowmobile racing